William C. (Bill) Faure (17 July 1949 – 18 October 1994) was a South African film director and writer, best known for writing and directing Shaka Zulu, a 1986 television mini series. The show still has a massive following in South Africa and worldwide.

Death
He died at the age of 45 in Johannesburg of kidney failure.

External links

References

1949 births
1994 deaths
South African film directors